Alice Martha Treff (4 June 1906 – 8 February 2003) was a German film actress. She appeared in more than 120 films between 1932 and 2001. She was born and died in Berlin, Germany.

Selected filmography

 Peter Voss, Thief of Millions (1932)
 Melody of Love (1932)
The Green Domino (1935)
 The Girl Irene (1936)
 The Irresistible Man (1937)
 The Night of Decision (1938)
 Mistake of the Heart (1939)
 Wedding in Barenhof (1942)
 Two in a Big City (1942)
 Front Theatre (1942)
 The Endless Road (1943)
 Circus Renz (1943)
 In Those Days (1947)
 Ghost in the Castle (1947)
 Street Acquaintances (1948)
 Dangerous Guests (1949)
 Girls Behind Bars (1949)
 Night of the Twelve (1949)
 Der Auftrag Höglers (1950)
 My Niece Susanne (1950)
 The Sinful Border (1951)
 That Can Happen to Anyone (1952)
 The Flower of Hawaii (1953)
 Canaris (1954)
 The Silent Angel (1954)
 Ball of Nations (1954)
 The Faithful Hussar (1954)
 Ingrid – Die Geschichte eines Fotomodells (1955)
 The Ambassador's Wife (1955)
 Children, Mother, and the General (1955)
 One Woman Is Not Enough? (1955)
 Kitty and the Great Big World (1956)
 The Tour Guide of Lisbon (1956)
 The Girl Without Pyjamas (1957)
 Confessions of Felix Krull (1957)
 A Time to Love and a Time to Die (1958)
 The Csardas King (1958)
 The Girl from the Marsh Croft (1958)
 Crime After School (1959)
 The Woman by the Dark Window (1960)
 Grounds for Divorce (1960)
 You Must Be Blonde on Capri (1961)
 The Black Abbot (1963)
 Holiday in St. Tropez (1964)
 Condemned to Sin (1964)
 The Seventh Victim (1964)
 Don't Tell Me Any Stories (1964)
 Rhinegold (1978)
 Derrick:
"Abendfrieden" (1978) as Margarete Schübel
"Eine Rechnung geht nicht auf" (1980) as Frau Riebeck
"Das Mädchen in Jeans" (1984) as Eliane von Haidersfeld
"Familie im Feuer" (1985) as Frau Weiler
"Mord inklusive" (1988) as Frau von Wedel

References

External links

Photographs and literature

1906 births
2003 deaths
Actresses from Berlin
German film actresses
20th-century German actresses